West Windsor is a township in Mercer County, in the U.S. state of New Jersey. Located within the Raritan Valley region, the township is an outer-ring suburb of New York City in the New York metropolitan area, as defined by the United States Census Bureau. As of the 2020 United States census, the township's population was 29,518, an increase of 2,353 (+8.7%) from the 2010 census count of 27,165, which in turn reflected an increase of 5,258 (+24.0%) from the 21,907 counted in the 2000 census.

West Windsor and adjacent East Windsor were established by an act of the New Jersey Legislature on February 9, 1797, and incorporated on February 21, 1798, as two of the state's initial group of 104 townships, by partitioning provincial Windsor Township.

The Borough of Princeton (now part of Princeton) was formed from a portion of the township on February 11, 1813. The township is closely associated with that now much more widely known town and several localities within West Windsor use Princeton in their name, the most notable of those being Princeton Junction. The USPS 'Princeton' post office (08540) facility is located within West Windsor, and covers parts of the township designated by Princeton, NJ mailing addresses.

The university agreed in 2009 to make an annual payment in lieu of taxes of $50,000 that would be indexed to inflation to cover  of land in the township that the university had purchased in 2002.

West Windsor is frequently ranked among the highest-income municipalities in New Jersey. In 2008, Forbes listed West Windsor as the 15th most affluent neighborhood in the U.S. Using 2012–2016 data from the U.S. Census Bureau, NJ.com listed the township as the 9th highest-income in the state in its January 2018 article "The 19 wealthiest towns in New Jersey, ranked." Based on data from the American Community Survey for 2013–2017, West Windsor residents had a median household income of $175,684, ranked 4th in the state among municipalities with more than 10,000 residents, more than double the statewide median of $76,475.

History

Prior to individual European land acquisition and settlement around the turn of the 18th century, the primary residents of West Windsor were the Lenape Native Americans. The Assanhicans (Assunpinks) were the subtribe that inhabited the greater Trenton area; artifacts from their society are still found in West Windsor.

The first known European activity in the area now known as West Windsor dates to 1634, during the exploration of Captain Thomas Yong. Yong was an Englishman, who reportedly traded with the native Lenape people. The region was officially claimed for European settlement under the 1682 William Penn treaties, under which the Lenape conveyed vast portions of New Jersey and Pennsylvania to Quaker colonists.

The West Windsor area was within Piscataway Township when it was chartered on December 18, 1666. This changed upon the formation of Middlesex County in 1683.

New Windsor Township (West Windsor's predecessor), known later as Windsor Township, was unofficially formed in 1731, and officially created by Royal Charter on March 9, 1751, from a partition of Piscataway Township. Its borders encompassed today's West Windsor Township, all of present-day Princeton up to Nassau Street, and pre-partition East Windsor Township. In 1756, The College of New Jersey relocated to Nassau Hall in the village of Princeton.  When West Windsor and East Windsor were created from the division of Windsor Township on February 9, 1797, West Windsor's boundaries extended up to Nassau Street. Following the 1838 formation of Mercer County and further land acquisitions by Princeton in 1843 and 1853, West Windsor's borders were again redefined to reflect the township's current .

Historically, West Windsor relied heavily upon agriculture. Common products were wheat, tomatoes, rye, and potatoes. This identity dominated the township from its first settlement until the last half of the 20th century, and was really only extinguished upon the township's most rapid period of growth from the late 1970s-the 2000s.

However, this agrarian dominance incentivized the institution of slavery as well. Although records are sparse, township censuses indicate 190 slaves in Windsor Township in 1790. In West Windsor, there were 21 slaves in 1830 and 3 in 1840. Additionally, several late 1700s wills and 1800s "abandonments" show the presence of slavery in the township around the turn of the 19th century.

West Windsor never developed a centralized "downtown." Instead, The township contained within it (entirely or partly) several small hamlets whose names and locations are still identifiable and/or in use in contemporary times. They are as follows:

 Aqueduct (Mills) – centered at Mapleton Ave, Lower Harrison Street, and the Millstone River. Partly located in Plainsboro.
 Canal/Princeton Basin – at the intersection of Alexander Road and the Delaware & Raritan Canal. Partially located in Princeton.
Clarksville – at the intersection of Route 1 and Quakerbridge Road.
Dutch Neck – at the intersection of Village Roads East/West and South Mill Road.
Edinburg – at the intersection of Old Trenton and Edinburg Roads.
 Jugtown/Queenston – at the intersection of Nassau and Harrison Streets. Now fully located in Princeton.
Grovers Mill – at the intersection of Cranbury and Clarksville Roads.
Penns Neck – Centered at the intersection of Washington Road and Route 1.
Port Windsor/Mercer – at the end of Quakerbridge Road at the Delaware Canal. Partially located in Lawrence.
Princeton Junction – Initially centered at the Princeton Junction Train Station. Manifested after the mid-1860s relocation of the Camden & Amboy Railroad line (now the Northeast Corridor) and opening of the current station.

Grover's Mill in West Windsor was the site Orson Welles chose for the Martian invasion in his infamous 1938 radio broadcast of The War of the Worlds.

During the later part of the 20th century the township underwent dramatic changes, driven mainly by a major boom in new housing developments. For generations, West Windsor had existed mostly as a sparsely populated agricultural community according to a 1999 article in The New York Times, the township "has grown into a sprawl of expensive houses in carefully groomed developments, and home to nearly 20,000 people", since the 1970s.

The West Windsor post office was found to be infected with anthrax during the anthrax attacks in 2001–2002.

In April 2002, a memorial was dedicated to the seven residents of West Windsor who died in the September 11 terrorist attacks.

In October 2019, the Historical Society of West Windsor published an online museum exploring the history of West Windsor.

Geography

According to the United States Census Bureau, the township had a total area of 26.25 square miles (68.00 km2), including 25.55 square miles (66.17 km2) of land and 0.71 square miles (1.83 km2) of water (2.69%).

Princeton Junction (with a 2010 Census population of 2,465) is an unincorporated community and census-designated place located within West Windsor. Other unincorporated communities in the township include Berrien City, Dutch Neck, Edinburg, Grover's Mill, Millstone, Penns Neck, Port Mercer, Post Corner, and Princeton Ivy East.

The township borders the municipalities of East Windsor, Hamilton Township, Lawrence Township, Princeton and Robbinsville Township in Mercer County; and Plainsboro Township in Middlesex County.

The local school district has developed a report identifying significant potential growth in the number of students enrolling from this and other residential development in both West Windsor and Plainsboro. In 2019, Atlantic Realty purchased the property, and in November 2020 they and the township reached an agreement to restrict the tract to non-residential use and convert it to warehouse space. The West Windsor Planning Board granted approval to build 5.5 million square feet of warehouse space (called "Bridge Point 8") on June 29, 2022."

Climate
According to the Köppen climate classification system, West Windsor has a hot-summer, wet all year, humid continental climate (Dfa) by the 0-degree-Celcius isotherm and humid subtropical by -3-degree-Celcius isotherm. Dfa climates are characterized by at least one month having an average mean temperature ≤ 32.0 °F (≤ 0.0 °C), at least four months with an average mean temperature ≥ 50.0 °F (≥ 10.0 °C), at least one month with an average mean temperature ≥ 71.6 °F (≥ 22.0 °C), and no significant precipitation difference between seasons. During the summer months, episodes of extreme heat and humidity can occur with heat index values ≥ 100 °F (≥ 38 °C). On average, the wettest month of the year is July which corresponds with the annual peak in thunderstorm activity. During the winter months, episodes of extreme cold and wind can occur with wind chill values < 0 °F (< −18 °C). The plant hardiness zone at the West Windsor Municipal Court is 7a with an average annual extreme minimum air temperature of 0.2 °F (−17.7 °C).

Ecology
According to the A. W. Kuchler U.S. potential natural vegetation types, West Windsor would have an Appalachian Oak (104) vegetation type with an Eastern Hardwood Forest (25) vegetation form.

Demographics

AOL/NeighborhoodScout named West Windsor in 2009 as the best neighborhood to raise children because of its school district (top 7% in New Jersey, top 3% nationwide), prevailing family type (families with school-aged children), and neighborhood safety (safer than 97% of neighborhoods). As of January 2018 the township's population was the second most educated in the state of New Jersey, according to an analysis by NJ.com. The percent of residents with a bachelor's degree or higher was 81.7%, with 48% of residents holding advanced graduate or professional degrees.

2010 census

The Census Bureau's 2006–2010 American Community Survey showed that (in 2010 inflation-adjusted dollars) median household income was $137,265 (with a margin of error of +/− $12,610) and the median family income was $156,110 (+/− $6,769). Males had a median income of $120,662 (+/− $6,410) versus $71,151 (+/− $9,841) for females. The per capita income for the township was $59,946 (+/− $3,307). About 3.6% of families and 4.9% of the population were below the poverty line, including 5.2% of those under age 18 and 4.7% of those age 65 or over.

2000 census
As of the 2000 United States census there were 21,907 people, 7,282 households, and 5,985 families residing in the township.  The population density was 842.4 people per square mile (325.2/km2). There were 7,450 housing units at an average density of 286.5 per square mile (110.6/km2). The racial makeup of the township was 71.53% White, 2.76% African American, 0.08% Native American, 22.76% Asian, 0.01% Pacific Islander, 1.08% from other races, and 1.78% from two or more races. Hispanic or Latino of any race were 4.07% of the population.

As of the 2000 Census, 8.31% of West Windsor's residents identified themselves as being of Chinese ancestry. This was the fourth highest percentage of people with Chinese ancestry in any place in New Jersey with 1,000 or more residents identifying their ancestry.

There were 7,282 households, out of which 50.4% had children under the age of 18 living with them, 75.3% were married couples living together, 5.1% had a female householder with no husband present, and 17.8% were non-families. 14.6% of all households were made up of individuals, and 2.8% had someone living alone who was 65 years of age or older. The average household size was 3.01 and the average family size was 3.36.

In the township the population was spread out, with 31.8% under the age of 18, 4.4% from 18 to 24, 31.4% from 25 to 44, 26.2% from 45 to 64, and 6.2% who were 65 years of age or older.  The median age was 37 years. For every 100 females, there were 98.3 males.  For every 100 females age 18 and over, there were 95.8 males.

The median income for a household in the township was $116,335, and the median income for a family was $127,877. Males had a median income of $100,000 versus $56,002 for females. The per capita income for the township was $48,511.  About 2.0% of families and 2.5% of the population were below the poverty line, including 2.4% of those under age 18 and 2.3% of those age 65 or over.

Economy 
NRG Energy has its corporate headquarters in West Windsor.

Arts and culture
The West Windsor Arts Center is the junction where the arts and community meet. They offer performances, classes, workshops, exhibitions, literary arts events and various other special events. It is located in the historic Princeton Junction Firehouse.

The Mercer County Italian-American Festival, established in 2000 and held annually in West Windsor, celebrated its 20th annual event in September 2019.

MCTV 26
Mercer County Television (MCTV) channel 26 is an Educational-access television station in West Windsor that is owned and operated by Mercer County Community College (MCCC). The student television station is transmitted to all of Mercer County, New Jersey, via cable TV channel 26 on Xfinity and Optimum, reaching an excess of 90,000 households. MCTV was added as Verizon FiOS channel 20 in Mercer County starting in 2009.

Parks and recreation
Richard J. Coffee Mercer County Park is located on Old Trenton Road. Administered by the Mercer County Park Commission and located primarily in West Windsor, it has athletic fields, a dog park, picnic grounds, a newly renovated boathouse and marina on Mercer Lake, bike trails and an ice skating rink that is home to the Mercer Bulldogs special hockey team.

The West Windsor Community Park is a  public park which serves as the primary park for active recreation. Facilities include a playground, jogging/bicycling paths, basketball courts, dog parks, a skate park, tennis courts and pickleball courts. This park also features 3 baseball fields and an indoor baseball facility where many children go to train. The park is also home to the West Windsor Waterworks Family Aquatics Center.

Duck Pond Park is a  park under construction located off Meadow Road between the intersections with Clarksville Road and Bear Brook Road, bordering Duck Pond Run. It is designed to be a "second community park" for the township. As of 2015, lighted soccer fields have been completed and in use by the West Windsor–Plainsboro Soccer Association, as well as tennis, volleyball and basketball courts. Future plans include a playground, picnic areas, an amphitheater, and a fishing pond.

Government

Local government 
West Windsor is governed under the Faulkner Act (formally known as the Optional Municipal Charter Law) within the mayor-council form of New Jersey municipal government (Plan 6), implemented based on the recommendations of a Charter Study Commission as of July 1, 1993. The township is one of 71 municipalities (of the 564) statewide that use this form of government. From the time of its formation in 1797, until 1993, the township was governed by a township committee, which combined both executive and legislative authority. In May 1993, West Windsor residents voted to change their form of government to a Faulkner Act form of government.

The governing body is comprised of the Mayor and the five-member Township Council. Under the township's mayor-council form of government, the mayor and council function as independent branches of government. The mayor is the chief executive of the township and heads its administration. The mayor is elected in a non-partisan election and serves for a four-year term. The mayor may attend council meetings but is not obligated to do so. The council is the legislative branch. The five members of the township council are elected on a non-partisan basis for four-year terms on a staggered basis, with either two seats (and the mayoral seat) or three seats up for vote in odd-numbered years as part of the November general election. At the annual organizational meeting held during the first week of January of each year, the Council elects a president and vice president to serve for one-year terms. The council president chairs the meetings of the governing body. Starting in 2011, the township's elections were shifted from May to November as part of an effort to lower costs of running standalone municipal elections and as part of an effort to increase voter participation.

, the mayor of West Windsor is Hemant Marathe, whose term of office ends December 31, 2025; Marathe is the first Indian-American to serve as the township's mayor. Members of the West Windsor Township Council are Council President Sonia Gawas (2023), Council Vice President Linda Geevers (2025), Andrea Sue Mandel (2023), Michael Ray Stevens (2023) and Martin Whitfield (2025).

In June 2017, council president Peter Mendonez resigned from office. Council vice president Allison Miller was chosen to serve as acting council president and Jyotika Bahree was appointed to fill the vacant seat left by Miller expiring in December 2019. In the November 2018 general election, Yingchao "YZ" Zhang was elected to serve the balance of the term of office.

In June 2015, the township council selected Hemant Marathe to fill the vacant seat expiring December 2015 of Kristina Samonte, who had resigned from office in the previous month as she was relocating out of the township.

Federal, state and county representation 
West Windsor is located in the 12th Congressional District and is part of New Jersey's 15th state legislative district. Prior to the 2011 reapportionment following the 2010 Census, West Windsor Township had been in the 14th state legislative district.

Politics
As of March 2011, there were a total of 16,034 registered voters in West Windsor, of which 5,384 (33.6%) were registered as Democrats, 2,968 (18.5%) were registered as Republicans and 7,672 (47.8%) were registered as unaffiliated. There were 10 voters registered as Libertarians or Greens.

In the 2012 presidential election, Democrat Barack Obama received 63.1% of the vote (7,769 cast), ahead of Republican Mitt Romney with 35.7% (4,401 votes), and other candidates with 1.2% (148 votes), among the 14,045 ballots cast by the township's 17,891 registered voters (1,727 ballots were spoiled), for a turnout of 78.5%. In the 2008 presidential election, Obama received 64.3% of the vote (7,895 cast), ahead of Republican John McCain with 33.3% (4,092 votes) and other candidates with 1.0% (125 votes), among the 12,273 ballots cast by the township's 16,548 registered voters, for a turnout of 74.2%.

In the 2013 gubernatorial election, Republican Chris Christie received 63.0% of the vote (4,983 cast), ahead of Democrat Barbara Buono with 35.3% (2,793 votes), and other candidates with 1.7% (137 votes), among the 8,181 ballots cast by the township's 17,648 registered voters (268 ballots were spoiled), for a turnout of 46.4%. In the 2009 gubernatorial election, Democrat Jon Corzine received 49.5% of the vote (3,918 ballots cast), ahead of Republican Chris Christie with 43.4% (3,436 votes), Independent Chris Daggett with 6.0% (474 votes) and other candidates with 0.4% (34 votes), among the 7,914 ballots cast by the township's 16,267 registered voters, yielding a 48.7% turnout.

Education

Colleges and universities
West Windsor is the site of the West Windsor Campus of Mercer County Community College.

Princeton University's satellite campus is located in West Windsor.

Public

West Windsor and Plainsboro are part of a combined school district, the West Windsor-Plainsboro Regional School District, which serves students in pre-kindergarten through twelfth grade from the two communities. The district has four elementary schools (grades Pre-K/K–3), two upper elementary schools (grades 4 and 5), two middle schools (grades 6–8) and two high schools (grades 9–12). As of the 2020–21 school year, the district, comprised of 10 schools, had an enrollment of 9,386 students and 773.2 classroom teachers (on an FTE basis), for a student–teacher ratio of 12.1:1. Schools in the district (with 2020–21 enrollment data from the National Center for Education Statistics) are 
Dutch Neck Elementary School (located in West Windsor: 704 students; in grades K-3), 
Maurice Hawk Elementary School (West Windsor: 723; K-3), 
Town Center Elementary School (Plainsboro: 431; PreK-2), 
J.V.B. Wicoff Elementary School (Plainsboro: 349; K-3), 
Millstone River School (Plainsboro: 967; 3-5), 
Village School (West Windsor: 617; 4-5), 
Community Middle School (Plainsboro: 1,131; 6-8), 
Thomas R. Grover Middle School (West Windsor: 1,208; 6-8), 
West Windsor-Plainsboro High School North (Plainsboro: 1,521; 9-12) and 
West Windsor-Plainsboro High School South (West Windsor: 1,649; 9-12). The district is overseen by a directly elected nine-member board of education whose seats are allocated to the two constituent municipalities based on population, with five of the nine seats allocated to West Windsor.

Three of the district's schools have been recognized by the National Blue Ribbon Schools Program. West Windsor-Plainsboro High School South was recognized during the 1992–1993 school year and Maurice Hawk Elementary School was recognized in 1993–1994, while West Windsor-Plainsboro High School North was recognized in the 2006–2007 school year.

Eighth grade students from all of Mercer County are eligible to apply to attend the high school programs offered by the Mercer County Technical Schools, a county-wide vocational school district that offers full-time career and technical education at its Health Sciences Academy, STEM Academy and Academy of Culinary Arts, with no tuition charged to students for attendance.

Private
The Wilberforce School, a K–12 school founded in 2005 that offers a Classical Christian education, moved to new facilities in the township in 2014.

Transportation

Roads and highways

U.S. Route 1 is the largest and busiest highway in West Windsor, crossing the northwestern sections of the township, oriented southwest to northeast. CR 533 (Quakerbridge Road) passes along the western border with Lawrence. CR 526 and CR 571 are multiplexed together from the northwestern part of the township until they split in the center of the municipality. CR 535 passes through in the south and serves Mercer County Community College. New Jersey Route 64 is a short, unsigned state highway that runs  concurrent with CR 526/CR 571 where they cross the Northeast Corridor rail line.

Other major roads that are accessible in neighboring municipalities include: Interstate 295 in Hamilton and Lawrence, Interstate 195 in Hamilton and Robbinsville, and the New Jersey Turnpike (Interstate 95) in Robbinsville (Exit 7A) and East Windsor (Exit 8).

Public transportation

Princeton Junction station, a Northeast Corridor stop on Amtrak and NJ Transit, is located within West Windsor. Amtrak's Keystone Service and Northeast Regional routes stop at Princeton Junction which is ranked as one of the ten busiest train stations in the Northeast. The station had 6,800 average weekday boardings in 2012, the fourth-highest of any NJ Transit station in the state.

Running between the Princeton Junction station and the Princeton station is what is known to locals as the "Dinky." The Dinky is a one-car train that shuttles back and forth many times a day between the two stations. Traveling  each way, it is the shortest regularly scheduled passenger route in the United States.

NJ Transit bus service to Trenton is provided via the 600, 603, 609, with other area service on the 605 route.

The Greater Mercer Transportation Management Association offers service on Route 130 between the West Windsor Campus of Mercer County Community College and East Windsor Township / Hightstown.

Notable people

People who were born in, residents of, or otherwise closely associated with West Windsor include:

 Jack Aker (born 1940), former Major League Baseball pitcher
 Kevin Barry (born 1978), Atlanta Braves relief pitcher
 Kevin Chapman, author and attorney
 Aneesh Chopra (born 1972), first Chief Technology Officer of the United States
 Stanley Dancer (1927–2005), harness racing driver and trainer
 Eileen Filler-Corn (born 1964), member of the Virginia House of Delegates since 2010 who was chosen in 2019 to become the first woman to serve as Speaker
 Douglas Forrester (born 1953), former mayor of West Windsor Township who was the Republican Party nominee for U.S. Senator in 2002 and for Governor of New Jersey in 2005
 John W. Hartmann (born 1967), politician who served in the New Jersey General Assembly from the 15th Legislative District from 1992 to 1994
 Ethan Hawke (born 1970), actor
 Kris Kolluri (born ), former Commissioner of the New Jersey Department of Transportation
 Matt Lalli (born 1986), professional lacrosse player for the Boston Cannons of Major League Lacrosse
 Paul Lansky (born 1944), composer
 Ben H. Love (1930–2010), the eighth Chief Scout Executive of the Boy Scouts of America serving from 1985 to 1993
 Barbara Majeski (born 1973), television personality and lifestyle expert
 Ramesses McGuiness (born 2000), footballer who plays for the U.S. Virgin Islands national team
 Christopher McQuarrie (born 1968), screenwriter, director and producer who is a regular collaborator of director Bryan Singer, with whom he co-wrote the screenplay of Singer's Public Access, wrote the screenplay for The Usual Suspects, co-wrote and produced Valkyrie and co-wrote Jack the Giant Slayer and Edge of Tomorrow
 Lyle and Erik Menendez (born 1968), notorious 1990s California convicted criminals
 Glenn Michibata (born 1962), retired professional tennis player who has been tennis coach of the Princeton Tigers
 James Murphy (born 1970), singer, songwriter, DJ, electronic musician (as LCD Soundsystem)
 John Forbes Nash Jr. (1928–2015), Nobel Prize-winning mathematician who was the subject of the film A Beautiful Mind
 Taktin Oey (born ), composer
 Fernando Perez (born 1983), Tampa Bay Rays outfielder
 Steve Rogers (born 1949), former pitcher for the Montreal Expos baseball team
 Bryan Singer (born 1965), film and television director
 David Zhuang (born 1963), Olympic table tennis player

References

External links

Official township web site
Historical Society of West Windsor web site

 
1798 establishments in New Jersey
Faulkner Act (mayor–council)
Populated places established in 1798
Townships in Mercer County, New Jersey